Psalm 141 is the 141st psalm from the Book of Psalms. It is attributed to David, a plea to God not only for protection from the psalmist's enemies, but also from temptation to sin.

In the slightly different numbering system used in the Greek Septuagint version of the Bible, and in the Vulgate, this psalm is Psalm 140.  

This psalm contains a prayer for deliverance from 'the enticements and the oppression of the wicked', and seeks 'divine support to live a sinless life', probably a prayer of an ordinary worshipper, although it has some indications for being a "king's psalm" offered during 'a military campaign far away from Jerusalem' (such as that he cannot offer sacrifice in the temple in verse 2 and laments over battle losses in verses 7).

Text

Analysis
Verses 6-7 ("When their judges are overthrown in stony places...." in the KJV, or "thrown down from the cliffs" in the New International Version) are likely corrupt, and scholars call their translation a best guess.

Verses 8–10 express a plea for help against persecutors, in terms similar to Psalm 140 (cf. Psalm 35:8), and a wisdom teaching to be kept away from bad company (verse 4) is similar to Psalm 1. C. S. Rodd suggests that there are two sets of petitions in prayer, verses 5-7 and verses 8-10, although verse 5 might be read as belonging to the second petition. Alexander Kirkpatrick suggests that the final line of verse 5 could be read as a prayer "against their evil deeds" or "in the midst" of them.

The gins (viz. engines) in the KJV text of verse 9 translates מקשות, rendered "traps" in more recent translations (NRSV, NASB).

Liturgy

As verse 2 compares prayer to an evening sacrifice, this psalm became part of Christian liturgy from an early time. 
John Chrysostom indicates that it was sung every day. As part of the liturgy practiced at Constantinople, it is preserved in the Liturgy of the Presanctified Gifts. 

As part of the liturgy, it also has numerous musical adaptations, including Russian compositions (Да исправится молитва моя)
by Dmitry Bortniansky, Mikhail Glinka, Aleksandr Grechaninov and Pavel Chesnokov.

The Latin text (Dirigatur oratio mea) is adapted in a gradual by Johann Michael Haydn (MH 520) and in a motet by Orlande de Lassus.

The Lutheran Service Book and Evangelical Lutheran Worship feature the psalm prominently in their Evening Prayer services.

References

External links 

 in Hebrew and English - Mechon-mamre
 King James Bible - Wikisource

141
Works attributed to David